Raniban may refer to:

Raniban, Bheri, Nepal
Raniban, Seti, Nepal
Raniban, Sagarmatha, Nepal